Scanning thermal microscopy (SThM) is a type of scanning probe microscopy that maps the local temperature and thermal conductivity of an interface. The probe in a scanning thermal microscope is sensitive to local temperatures – providing a nano-scale thermometer. Thermal measurements at the nanometer scale are of both scientific and industrial interest.  The technique was invented by Clayton C. Williams and H. Kumar Wickramasinghe in 1986.

Applications
SThM allows thermal measurements at the nano-scale. These measurements can include: temperature, thermal properties of materials, thermal conductivity, heat capacity, glass transition temperature, latent heat,  enthalpy, etc. The applications include:
Ultra large-scale integration (ULSI) lithography research and cellular diagnostics in biochemistry.
Detecting such parameters as phase changes in polymer blends.
Joule heating
Measuring material variations in semiconductor devices
Subsurface imaging
Near-field photo thermal micro-spectroscopy 
Data storage
Calorimetry applications
Hot-spots in integrated circuits 
Low temperature scanning thermal microscopy 
Magnetic spectroscopy in combination with the ferromagnetic resonance realized in the SThM-FMR technique 
Other applications

Technique
SThM requires the use of specialized probes. There are two types of thermal probes: Thermocouple probes where the probe temperature is monitored by a thermocouple junction at the probe tip and resistive or bolometer probes where the probe temperature is monitored by a thin-film resistor at probe tip. These probes are generally made from thin dielectric films on a silicon substrate and use a metal or semiconductor film bolometer to sense the tip temperature. Other approaches, using more involved micro machining methods, have also been reported. In a bolometer probe the resistor is used as a local heater and the fractional change in probe resistance is used to detect the temperature and/or the thermal conductance of the sample. When the tip is placed in contact with the sample, heat flows from the tip to sample. As the probe is scanned, the amount of heat flow changes. By monitoring the heat flow, one can create a thermal map of the sample, revealing spatial variations in thermal conductivity in a sample. Through a calibration process, the SThM can reveal the quantitative values of thermal conductivity.  Alternately the sample may be actively heated, for example a powered circuit, to visualize the distribution of temperatures on the sample.

Tip-sample heat transfer can include 
 Solid-solid conduction. Probe tip to sample. This is the transfer mechanism which yields the thermal scan.
 Liquid-liquid conduction. When scanning in non-zero humidity, a liquid meniscus forms between the tip and sample. Conduction can occur through this liquid drop.
 Gas conduction. Heat can be transferred through the edges of the probe tip to the sample.

References

External links

SThM tutorial
SThM-FMR technique
SThM designs

Scanning probe microscopy